

I

J

K

L

M